Nightlosers is a Romanian ethno-jazz-blues band.  The band consists of Hanno Höfer (guitars, harmonica, washboard, vocals), Octavian Barila Andreescu (bass), El Lako Jimy (drums), and Géza Grunzó (keyboards). The band has seen a number of changes. Earlier members include Sandy Deac, Sorin Câmpean, Lucian Cioargă, Ovidiu Condrea, and bass player Octavian "Barila" Andreescu. 

At various times, the band has invited others to take part notably vocalists Kati Panek, Sanda Lăcătuș, Tanta Lăcătuș, clarinet player Liviu Todea, musicians Nucu Pandrea and Pusztai Aladar.

Nightlosers' music is influenced by Gypsy and Romanian folk music.

Discography 
 Sitting on Top of the World (1995)
 Plum Brandy Blues (1997)
 Rhythm & Bulz (2004)
 Cinste lor (2013)

References

External links
 
Romanian musical groups